Ceralocyna marcelae is a species of beetle in the family Cerambycidae. It was described by Hovore & Chemsak in 2005.

References

Ceralocyna
Beetles described in 2005